Paris Métro Line 18 is a planned line of the metropolitan network of Paris.

It will be an automatic metro line with an adapted gauge of the Grand Paris Express. 35 kilometers long, it will initially link Orly Airport to Versailles via Massy – Palaiseau, the Saclay plateau and Saint-Quentin-en-Yvelines. Subsequently, it would be extended by about 15 kilometers from Versailles to Nanterre via Rueil-Malmaison.

It should be completed after 2030. Its first section, from Orly airport to the Saclay plateau (CEA Saint-Aubin), is scheduled for 2026 between the stations of Massy-Palaiseau and CEA Saint- Aubin, and 2027 between Massy-Palaiseau and Orly airport. One of its vocations is in particular to serve the technological and scientific pole Paris-Saclay and the Paris-Saclay University. It should also have given access to the site which was envisaged for the aborted project of French candidacy for the organization of the Universal Exhibition of 2025.

Project management for engineering and stations has been entrusted to the Icare group, led by Ingérop Consulting and Engineering, with several architectural firms for the various stations of the section while the systems are under the responsibility by Egis Rail. The viaduct and the overhead stations are entrusted to the Benthem Crouwel group.

It will be the only metro line of the Grand Paris Express that will serve the department of Yvelines with three stations in two municipalities: the station of Versailles-Chantiers and that of Satory will be located at Versailles and the Saint-Quentin Est station will be located at Guyancourt.



History 

Line 18 is the result of the Grand Paris public transport network project, presented by the President of the Republic Nicolas Sarkozy in 2009. This provided for a large gauge green line connecting Orly Airport to Roissy via Saclay and La Défense. The green line is then included in the Grand Paris Express project with a terminus this time fixed at Nanterre, with entry into service then envisaged between 2025 and 2030.

On 6 March 2013, the Prime Minister Jean-Marc Ayrault unveils the map of the future network of the Nouveau Grand Paris (new name of the Grand Paris Express), on which appears for the first time the denomination of "line 18". Its route is then limited to the section Orly Airport – Versailles-Chantiers, the future of the section to Nanterre becoming uncertain. A variant of the route making it possible to serve the Versailles Saint-Quentin-en-Yvelines University was being considered, but was subsequently abandoned in favor of a more direct route. It is also on this occasion that the choice of a metro with an appropriate gauge is indicated, in view of the expected ridership which does not justify trains as large as on the other lines.

In 2014, Prime Minister Manuel Valls announced that the sections  CEA Saint-Aubin  –  Massy – Palaiseau  and  Massy – Palaiseau  –  Orly Airport  would be effective from 2024, the line having to be ready in time to serve the site envisaged for the Universal Exhibition of 2025.

The reinforced consultation on the line 18 project (section  Orly Airport  –  Versailles-Chantiers ) took place from  12 May to  12 June 2015. The public investigation file was sent to the regional prefect by the SGP in the summer of 2015, for an investigation from  21 March to  26 April 2016.

Line 18 is  declared of public utility on 28 March 2017.

In January 2018, Prime Minister Édouard Philippe announced the withdrawal of the French candidacy for the organization of the Universal Exhibition of 2025. It was then envisaged that a first section from Massy-Palaiseau to CEA Saint-Aubin be put into service from 2026.

From Monday 15 June to Friday 17 July 2020, an additional public inquiry is carried out, to obtain an amending declaration of public utility, allowing the declaration of public utility to be made compatible with the town planning documents of Orsay, Palaiseau and Wissous.

Calendar 

Line 18 should be put into service according to the following stages:
 by 2027, for the section from  CEA Saint-Aubin  to  Orly Airport ;
 by 2030, for the section from  CEA Saint-Aubin  to  Versailles-Chantiers ;
 beyond 2030, for the section from  Versailles-Chantiers  to  Nanterre-La Folie .

Specifications 
The cars will have a width of approximately 2.50 meters (a size similar to that of the current Paris metro) and the trains will be composed of three or four cars which can accommodate 350 travelers by train. The trains will be supplied by a third rail in 1500 V, unlike lines 15, 16 and 17.<ref name = "description line 18"> en-mouvement-ligne-18 / meeting-from-May-12-to-June-12-2015-to know Meet-up from May 12 to June 12, 2015 to find out more,  Société du Grand Paris' '.</ref>

 Construction 
 Preparatory work 
Preparatory works (relocation of networks) start in January 2018 at the future station  Massy Opéra .

 Construction work 

The market for the construction of the tunnel, stations and service works between the future station Orly Airport and the Saclay plateau, beyond the Massy station. Palaiseau was awarded in May 2020 to a consortium made up of Vinci Construction Grands Projets, Spie Batignolles Civil Engineering, Dodin Campenon-Bernard, Vinci Construction France, Spie Batignolles Foundations and Boots Foundations. The amount of the contract is EUR 799 million excluding taxes. This contract includes the construction of 11.8 kilometers of tunnel which will be dug by two tunnel boring machines, the construction of the Antonypôle, Massy Opéra and Massy-Palaiseau stations, as well as the crossing of the future Aéroport d 'Orly, already under construction, and 13 works of service east of the line.

 Line 18 tunnel boring machines 

 Tracks and stations 
 Plot 

With a length of 35 km, line 18 has an underground section of approximately 22 km (61% of the line) and an overhead section of 13 km (39% of line).

The line starts underground at Orly Airport to the south-east at the limit of the departments of Essonne and Val-de-Marne, under the car parks between the west and south terminals. The station is in correspondence with the Line 14 (which is parallel to it) and is extended by a rear station.

The route heads north and passes under the airport runways before turning west. It crosses the municipality of Wissous without stopping, passes under the A6 and A10 highways and then turns slightly south before turning serve the station "Antonypôle" located in the town of Antony, Hauts-de-Seine. Entering the territory of the municipality of Massy, the line then serves "Massy Opéra" then passes under the LGV Atlantique before coming into line with the beam train from Massy – Palaiseau. It then serves the station of the same name where it connects with the RER B, RER C and TGV station.

The line slants again towards the west and enters the town of Palaiseau before passing under the D36 then coming to stand parallel to the latter at the level of the district "Camille-Claudel." At this point the line becomes aerial and is inserted into a viaduct. It goes beyond the connection to the future Palaiseau maintenance workshop, bypasses the École polytechnique then serves after a curve and a counter-curve the air station of "Palaiseau". The viaduct then heads south, crosses N118 and serves the  Orsay-Gif  station located at the limit of Orsay, Gif-sur-Yvette and Saint-Aubin. The route then heads due north then north-west along N118 and serves the  CEA Saint-Aubin  station in Saclay.

The line then turns towards the west and crosses a long inter-station still in the air along the D36. It crosses the municipalities of Villiers-le-Bâcle and Châteaufort, marking the entry of the line into Yvelines. It then arrives at the National Golf of Magny-les-Hameaux and finds its course underground.

The tunnel heads north-east and serves the underground station of "Saint-Quentin Est" at Guyancourt. It crosses Guyancourt then oblique towards the east and arrives at the station "Satory" located at Versailles. Finally, the line passes under N12 and heads north-east before running alongside the railway tracks and arriving at the terminus of Versailles – Chantiers where it connects to RER C and Transiliens U and N.

 List of stations 

 Operations center 
An operations center playing the role of maintenance and storage site for trains is planned at Palaiseau, along the departmental route 36, near the École Polytechnique campus. Earthworks, carried out by Eiffage, begin in 3rd quarter 2020.

 Reviews 
Many local criticisms have been voiced regarding this project. Thus, residents and elected officials of the municipalities crossed by the aerial metro ask that it be buried. In addition, the inhabitants of Wissous, a town located between Antony and Orly Airport, crossed by the line but not served by it, in fact feel forgotten by the project.

The most important criticisms come from expert opinions outside the field of local democracy, pointing out in particular a gap difficult to justify between the dimensioning of this infrastructure and the flows that it would accommodate in view of the tools of territorial analysis and flow simulation. . Indeed, the justification of the line 18 project within the overall public transport network project of Greater Paris presented in 2009–2010 was that of the connection of employment centers among them, which would imply a significant flow between them. However, " connections between job centers in Île-de-France only represent 3% of transport needs ". In addition, the analysis of the socio-economic characteristics of the territories crossed shows that we have in the Orly pole " a high proportion of workers "on the spot", that is to say holding a job. in their commune of residence  ", and that in the centers of Massy and Versailles," "trips are much more made internally than to an external basin" ".

Thus, from 2015, the General Investment Commission (CGI) issued an unfavorable opinion for line 18, in its Saclay-Versailles section.

The FNAUT Île-de-France transport users association considers  as  AUT / FNAUT Île-de-France therefore wishes that an opinion be rendered unfavorable to the public utility of this line}}.

According to Pascal Auzannet, former senior official in charge of reflections on the Grand Paris metro project within RATP in the 2010s, it would be wiser to extend the 7.3 kilometers from the Orlyval to the Saclay plateau. Indeed, with a transport capacity at peak hour greater than 7500 passengers, this possibility is compatible with the traffic forecasts presented in 2016 during a public inquiry. In an interview with the Public Establishment in charge of the development of the urban project of the Saclay plateau, subsequent to the publication of the book, he generalizes this comment by indicating: “ The choice of a metro (rather than simple buses on specific sites) was therefore fully justified, but was there a need for a heavy metro, as on the other lines, with the risk of overcapacity? Personally, I have always thought that the initial option was oversized. (...) at the beginning, we envisaged capacities of 40,000 passengers in each direction of traffic, while demand by 2030 should not exceed 5–6,000  ”.

On 22 June 2018, during a conference of "Professional Groups of Arts and Crafts", Jean-Marc Jancovici, speaking of the carbon impact of the various infrastructures, said: “  Line 18 […] will never refund its initial carbon, so if we want to do it [this project] on the grounds of carbon, we must not do it  ".

In July 2018, the Council of State rejected the requests of several communities and associations for the defense of the environment and validated the declaration of public utility.

In July 2020 during the last public inquiry into the project, FNAUT Île-de-France Transport Users Association pointed out in a message posted on the microblogging network Twitter that the socio-economic profitability of this line has been revised upwards in an unexplained manner.

 Development projects 

 The creation of a Camille-Claudel station 
In Palaiseau, elected officials and residents are mobilizing from 2015 for the construction of a new metro station at the right of the new eco-district of the city called  Camille-Claudel  which is to house 4000 inhabitants. This station should be located between the  Massy-Palaiseau  and  Palaiseau '' stops, at the point where the line emerges from the ground to pass into a viaduct.

The report of the public inquiry commission of 2016 recommends that a land reserve must be set up for the possible realization of this station after the opening of the line.

The amending DUP investigated from 15 June to 17 July 2020 takes this recommendation into account by modifying the profile of the line in the Palaiseau sector.

Extension to the west 
The line must be extended from Versailles to Nanterre beyond 2030. In 2019 this extension is not funded.

Towards an extension to the east 

During the meeting of the steering committee of the Orly airport station, on 3 May 2016, the Grand Paris company announced that in order not to mortgage the future, protective measures will be taken at the station Orly Airport to create a possible extension to the east of the line beyond 2030. This measure is taken after requests from local elected officials of Val-de-Marne and Essonne to connect Villeneuve-Saint-Georges, located on RER D, to the Orly airport area to facilitate its access. Other elected officials want the extension to go to Boissy-Saint-Léger station, located on RER A, to the same reasons. Finally, the department of Val-de-Marne via the Orbival association will mobilize elected officials to reflect on this extension.

The public inquiry commission recommends during its publication of 13 July 2016 that the Orly Airport station be built in such a way as to make possible an extension to RER D.

Tourism 
Line 18 will serve several notable points of Île-de-France:
 the Orly Airport;
 the Saclay plateau and its universities;
 the new town of Saint-Quentin-en-Yvelines in the town of Guyancourt;
 the city of Versailles.

Notes and references

See also

Related Articles 
 Paris Métro
 Grand Paris Express

External links 
 Line 18, presentation of the project on the site of the Société du Grand Paris
 Public survey of line 18

Paris Métro
2027 in rail transport